Catholic Guardian Services (CGS) is a human services non-profit organization sponsored by the Catholic Charities of the Archdiocese of New York with programs that help a large needy population in the New York metropolitan area.

With over 1200 employees across six offices and 34 residential facilities, CGS operates fifteen distinct programs and provides a range of services, including those in the areas of child abuse and neglect prevention, foster care, maternity services, and developmental disabilities. CGS’ mission is also supported by over 600 foster and adoptive parents.

CGS’ programs and services are delivered in partnerships with affiliates within the Archdiocese of New York, New York City government, New York State government, education agencies, foundations, policymakers, advocacy groups and others also committed to the well-being of those in its care.

The agency is a product of successive mergers between Catholic Guardian Society, Catholic Home Bureau and Rosalie Hall Inc.

History

Overview

Catholic Guardian Services is the product of three separate organizations, with discrete histories but similar missions. Each had the common goal of helping disadvantaged people and communities of New York City.  The history of Catholic Guardian Services contains several narratives that eventually converge after a series of administrative mergers.

Catholic Home Bureau for Dependent Children
The Catholic Home Bureau (CHB) was founded in 1898 by members of the St. Vincent de Paul Society.  However, the agency was neither incorporated nor legally authorized as “a charitable organization for the placing of Catholic children” until January 7, 1899, when Justice H. W. Bookstoner of the New York State Supreme Court signed off on its certification.  CHB became the first Catholic foster home agency in the United States, marking the official recognition of foster home care by Catholics in America.  The agency was founded to provide safe Catholic homes to institutionalized orphans to relieve overcrowded conditions at such facilities without shipping the children out West to likely Protestant homes on so-called orphan trains.

From 1899 to 1902, CHB placed 465 orphans with families across the Northeast in states such as New York, Pennsylvania, New Jersey, Connecticut, Vermont, and Indiana.  The agency continued to grow in the ensuing decades, and by January 31, 1925, CHB had placed 4,764 children in free and adoptive homes.  CHB funded such an operation with a combination of earnings, donations, and assistance from the St. Vincent de Paul Society.  The Department of Charities of New York City paid from $25 in 1898 to $50 in 1925 annually per child placed by the agency.

In 1909, the Board of Directors of CHB, led by Thomas Mulry with key participation from Edmund Butler, attended the first White House Conference on the Care of Dependent Children per invitation from President Theodore Roosevelt.  This conference aimed to garner government support for the protection of children from institutionalization and neglect, two objectives at the heart of CHB’s mission.  The agency witnessed great overhaul in 1925 as the St. Vincent de Paul Society withdrew its sponsorship, and Catholic Charities of the Archdiocese of New York and Diocese of Brooklyn assumed this responsibility.  This marked an extension of the services offered by CHB, and under the auspices of Catholic Charities, CHB established its own Maternity Services Program.

In the wake of this transferral of sponsorship, CHB expanded and adapted its services for decades.  After World War II, the Cardinal McCloskey Home opened in response to a massive uptick in the need of foster homes and served as a temporary location for children awaiting CHB placement.  The Cardinal McCloskey Home itself eventually entered the field of placing children and today is named Cardinal McCloskey Community Services. 
              
In 1976, Sister Una McCormack of the Dominican Sisters of Sparkill joined CHB and spearheaded an Independent Living Program geared toward helping teens care for themselves once discharged from foster care.  In 1984, CHB kick-started a family day care program in the Bronx to offer low cost, quality care to 275 children with working mothers.  In the mid to late 1980s, the agency began to serve New York’s homeless population with the St. James, Mitty, and St. Elizabeth Seton residences located in lower Manhattan and the Bronx.  In 1989, in response to the AIDS crisis, CHB opened Incarnation Children’s Center in Washington Heights as a transitional residence for HIV-infected babies and young children. In 2000, Incarnation Children’s Center became separately incorporated as a pediatric AIDS skilled nursing facility. 
              
After many more years of dynamic services and care, CHB underwent a major administrative change in 2006.  Catholic Home Bureau merged with Catholic Guardian Society to become the larger, more comprehensive agency, Catholic Guardian Society and Home Bureau (CGSHB), overseen by Executive Director John Frein.

Catholic Guardian Society of New York

The Catholic Guardian Society (CGS) of the Archdiocese of New York was founded in 1908 by Father Samuel Ludlow and later incorporated in 1913.  The fledgling agency offered aftercare services, providing for hundreds of children, particularly those of immigrants, discharged from institutional care.  These children were often orphans, born to working-class families, often newly arriving immigrants to the United States, vulnerable to disease and deprived of the necessary health care.  This model of operation continued for decades, characterized by strong leadership and dedication to the legacy left by Father Ludlow.  
              
The late 1960s and early 1970s witnessed major expansion throughout CGS, with the introduction of a whole array of new programs.  Between 1965 and 1974, Executive Directors Monsignor Edmund Fogarty and layman Mr. James P. O’Neill contributed heavily to the evolution of the agency with the additions of the Agency Operated Boarding Home Program, Group Home Program, the Adoption Department, the Education and Guidance Department, and the Medical Department.  This series of changes signified CGS’s departure from an exclusively aftercare service model into an area of greater, more comprehensive care.  
              
A trend of continuous improvement has followed the agency from those innovative years in the 1960s up through the present day.  For example, in 1978, after the Willowbrook exposé, CGS cooperated with the New York State Department of Mental Retardation and Developmental Disabilities to open a community residence for persons with profound handicaps.  In similar fashion, the agency again adapted its foster care services so as to be able to care for children afflicted with HIV/AIDS in the late 1980s in its newly created Special Medical Family Foster Care Program. 
              
In this millennium alone, CGS has also begun child abuse and neglect prevention programs and specialized residential treatment services for foster care youth with mental illness.  At the administrative level, CGS has undergone significant change as well; in 2006, Catholic Guardian Society merged with Catholic Home Bureau to create Catholic Guardian Society and Home Bureau (CGSHB).

Catholic Guardian Society and Home Bureau
After the 2006 merger between CGS and CHB, the new, better-equipped agency further developed many of its services.  In 2008, CGSHB received accreditation for international adoption services.  Later, in 2009, the organization formed an innovative Youth Employment Services (YES) program.  The YES program provides foster children with professional work experience with events like job fairs, thus giving them greater opportunity to establish self-sufficiency upon discharge from foster care.  Two years later, after CGSHB’s de facto merger with Rosalie Hall, maternity services throughout the agency were bolstered, resulting in the creation of its Rosalie Hall Maternity Services Parenting Resource Center.

Rosalie Hall

In September 1887, Archbishop Michael Corrigan of the Archdiocese of New York summoned five Misericordia Sisters from Montreal, Canada to provide care for the growing number of unmarried pregnant women in New York.  The Sisters arrived on Staten Island and established the New York Mothers’ Home. Soon, however, they moved to Harlem and later purchased land on 86th Street in Yorkville, where Rosalie Hall made its new home.  By the turn of the century, despite many difficulties, the Misericordia Sisters had given free service to almost 1,000 young mothers.  In 1904, as the quality of life in New York deteriorated due to economic downturn, the Sisters altered their charter to accommodate for all those in need of medical attention, not simply young mothers.  With this fundamental change in their services, they, too, changed the name of their home to Misericordia Hospital in 1905.  
            
By 1950, Misericordia Hospital was the second largest Catholic hospital in all of New York City.  In 1958, Misericordia Hospital moved to the Bronx, the fastest growing Catholic community in New York at the time.  Rosalie Hall moved with the hospital, and in its new location, Rosalie Hall would care for 28 residents at any one time.  Over the next several decades, Misericordia Hospital and Rosalie Hall offered their services to a host of needy individuals in the Bronx.  In 2008, Misericordia Hospital, then Our Lady of Mercy Hospital, joined Montefiore Medical Center.  Rosalie Hall eventually became a separately incorporated entity, and in 2011, Catholic Guardian Societies and Home Bureau and Rosalie Hall integrated services for pregnant and parenting adolescents in foster care and women in need.  By 2013, 125 years after its founding, Rosalie Hall Inc. permanently merged into Catholic Guardian Services to become the Rosalie Hall Maternity Services Division within it.

Catholic Guardian Services
In 2013, Catholic Guardian Society and Home Bureau changed its legal corporate name to Catholic Guardian Services, indicating a revitalization of its commitment to service, as described in its new tagline, “Providing Help, Creating Hope, Preserving Dignity.”  Later, in 2014, the newly branded Catholic Guardian Services began a federally sponsored program for unaccompanied minors to accommodate to migrant children fleeing dire circumstances in Central America.  Today, Catholic Guardian Services offers all of the care once offered separately by Catholic Guardian Society, Catholic Home Bureau, and Rosalie Hall Inc.

Services

Overview
Catholic Guardian Services offers a variety of programs to a diverse population.  The following presents a list of these services, as divided into three general areas.

Child Welfare Services
Child Welfare Services include:

Family foster care services (regular & kinship foster care and adoption services, treatment family foster care, family foster care for teens, specialized family foster care for children with complex medical conditions including HIV/AIDS.
Residential treatment services (assertive community treatment homes for adolescents, maternity and mother-child residence for pregnant and parenting teens).
Youth Employment Services and educational support services, medical and mental health services, and crisis intervention services for children in foster care.

Family Support Services
Family Support Services include:
Child abuse & neglect prevention services using evidence-based models of treatment.
Rosalie Hall Maternity Services (community outreach, case management services, pre- and post-natal care with visiting nurse services, mentoring and peer-to-peer counseling, parenting resource center with evidence-based parenting skills training, parenting options counseling, Hague-accredited domestic and international adoption services).
Bridges To Health (B2H Waiver Services for children with complex medical and mental health needs in foster care and post-discharge.
Healthy Families NY program for families with infants in need of additional support.
Shelter and Family Care for Unaccompanied Minors seeking refuge from violence and poverty in Central America.

Developmental Disability Services
Developmental Disability Services include:
Residential programs: geriatric services, services for dual-diagnosed individuals, services for the blind, services for the deaf, services for the non-ambulatory.
Respite care.

Governance
Catholic Guardian Services is governed by a board of directors, composed of 25 individuals representing different expertises.  Additionally, the agency functions with a group of 10 senior administrators at the forefront of all operations.  These administrators provide both oversight of general activity and development of specific programs within the agency.

References

External links

Non-profit organizations based in New York City
Religious charities based in the United States
Organizations established in 1899
Roman Catholic Archdiocese of New York
Charities based in New York City